The 2002 Camden Council election took place on 2 May 2002 to elect members of Camden London Borough Council in London, England. The whole council was up for election with boundary changes since the last election in 1998 reducing the number of seats by 5. The Labour party stayed in overall control of the council.

Election result
For the election Camden had a trial of early voting on 27–28 April in an attempt to increase turnout, however overall turnout at 28.4% was down on the 33.4% in 1998.

|}

Ward results

Belsize

Bloomsbury

Camden Town with Primrose Hill

Cantelowes

Fortune Green

Frognal and Fitzhjohns

Gospel Oak

Hampstead Town

Haverstock

Highgate

Holborn and Covent Garden

Kentish Town

Kilburn

King's Cross

Regent's Park

St Pancras and Somers Town

Swiss Cottage

West Hampstead

References

2002
2002 London Borough council elections